Olena Kharchenko (born 25 November 1995) is a Ukrainian-born Azerbaijani volleyball player who plays as middle-blocker for Çukurova Belediyespor in the Turkish Women's Volleyball League and the Azerbaijan national volleyball team.

References

Sources 
 

1995 births
Living people
Ukrainian women's volleyball players
Azerbaijani women's volleyball players
Ukrainian emigrants to Azerbaijan
Naturalized citizens of Azerbaijan
Middle blockers